Rocky Creek is a stream in the U.S. state of Wisconsin. It is a tributary to Yellow River.

Variant names have been "Rocky Run" and "Rocky Run Creek". The creek was named for its rocky character.

References

Rivers of Wood County, Wisconsin
Rivers of Wisconsin